This is a list of notable and famous South Africans who are the subjects of Wikipedia articles.

Academics

Academics

Estian Calitz, academic (born 1949)
Jakes Gerwel, academic and anti-apartheid activist (1946–2012)
Adam Habib, political scientist (born 1965)
Jan Hendrik Hofmeyr, academic and politician (1894–1948)
Thamsanqa Kambule, South African Mathematician and Educator (1921–2009)
Tshilidzi Marwala, academic and businessman (born 1971)
Revil Mason, archeologist (1929 - 2020) 
Shula Marks, historian (born 1938) 
Njabulo Ndebele, Principal of the University of Cape Town (born 1948)
D. C. S. Oosthuizen, philosopher, (1926–1968)
Adriaan N Pelzer, historian and Vice-Principal University Pretoria (1915–1981)
Michiel Daniel Overbeek, South African amateur astronomer and prolific variable star observers (1920–2001)
Pierre de Villiers Pienaar, pioneering role in speech language therapy and lexicography in South Africa (1904–1978)
Calie Pistorius, academic and Principal of the University of Pretoria (born 1958)
Benedict Wallet Vilakazi, author, educator, and first black South African to receive a PhD (1906–1947)
David Webster, anthropologist (1945–1989)

Medical and veterinary

Abraham Manie Adelstein, UK Chief Medical Statistician (1916–1992)
Christiaan Barnard, pioneering heart surgeon (1922–2001)
Wouter Basson, medical scientist (born 1950)
John Borthwick (veterinary surgeon), veterinary surgeon in the Cape Colony (1867–1936)
Mary Malahlela, first black woman to register as a medical doctor in South Africa (1916–1981)
Joan Morice, first female veterinary surgeon in South Africa (1904–1944)
Anna Coutsoudis, public health scientist (born 1952)
Patrick Soon-Shiong, surgeon, founder Abraxis BioScience, billionaire (born 1952)
Arnold Theiler, veterinarian (1867–1936)
Max Theiler, virologist, 1951 Nobel Prize winner (1899–1972)
Lindiwe Sidali, surgeon (born 1984)

Scientists

Andrew Geddes Bain, geologist (1797–1864)
Peter Beighton, geneticist (born 1934)
Wilhelm Bleek, linguist (1827–1875)
Robert Broom, palaeontologist (1866–1951)
Sydney Brenner, biologist, 2002 Physiology or Medicine Nobel Prize winner (1927–2019)
Phillip Clancey, ornithologist (1918–2001)
Allan McLeod Cormack, physicist (1924–1998)
Zodwa Dlamini, biochemist 
Clement Martyn Doke, linguist (1893–1980)
Mulalo Doyoyo, professor and inventor (born 1970)
Alexander du Toit, geologist (1878–1948)
Robert Allen Dyer, botanist (1900–1987)
Melville Edelstein, sociologist, killed due to Soweto uprising (1919–1976) 
Wendy Foden, conservation biologist
J. W. B. Gunning, zoologist (1860–1913)
Quarraisha Abdool Karim, Associate Scientific Director of the Centre for the AIDS Programme of Research in South Africa (CAPRISA) (born 1960)
Salim Abdool Karim,  South African epidemiologist and infectious diseases specialist (born 1960)
David Lewis-Williams, archaeologist (born 1934)
Lucy Lloyd, anthropologist (1834–1914)
Thebe Medupe, astrophysicist (born 1973)
Hans Merensky, geologist (1871–1952)
Austin Roberts, zoologist (1883–1948)
Peter Sarnak, mathematician (born 1953)
Ramotholo Sefako, astrophysicist (born 1971)
Buyisiwe Sondezi, physicist (born 1976)
Basil Schonland, physicist (1896–1972)
J.L.B. Smith, ichthyologist (1897–1968)
Phillip Tobias, palaeontologist (1925–2012)

Theologians
Also see: Prelates, clerics and evangelists

David Bosch (1929–1992)
John W. de Gruchy (born 1939)
Dion Forster (born 1972)
Johan Heyns (1928–1994)

Writers

Authors

 
Lady Anne Barnard, travel writer and artist (1750–1825)
Herman Charles Bosman, author (1905–1951)
André P. Brink, author (1935–2015)
Justin Cartwright, novelist (1943–2018)
John Maxwell Coetzee, 2003 Nobel Prize-winning author (born 1940)
K. Sello Duiker, novelist (1974–2005)
Sir Percy FitzPatrick, writer, businessman and politician (1862–1931)
Graeme Friedman, author and clinical psychologist
Damon Galgut, author (born 1963)
Nadine Gordimer, 1991 Nobel Prize-winning author (1923–2014)
Alfred Hutchinson, South African author, teacher and activist (1924–1972)
C. J. Langenhoven, writer and poet (1873–1932)
Pule Lechesa, essayist, literary critic, and poet (born 1976)
Kgotso Pieter David Maphalla, the Sesotho language writer (1955–2021)
Dalene Matthee, author (1938–2005)
Gcina Mhlope, author, storyteller, playwright, director, actor (born 1959)
Deon Meyer, author (born 1958)
Phaswane Mpe, novelist (1970–2004)
Sizwe Mpofu-Walsh, author and musician (born 1989)
Alan Paton, author (1903–1988)
Margaret Roberts, herbalist and writer (1937–2017)
Karel Schoeman, novelist and historian (1939–2017)
Olive Schreiner, author (1855–1920)
Mongane Wally Serote, poet and writer (born 8 May 1944)
Wilbur Smith, novelist (1933–2021)
J. R. R. Tolkien, author of The Lord of The Rings (1892–1973)
Etienne van Heerden, novelist (born 1956)
Marlene van Niekerk, novelist (born 1954)
Lyall Watson, writer (1939–2008)
David Yudelman, writer
Rachel Zadok, London-based South African writer (born 1972)

Editors
Kojo Baffoe, magazine editor (born 1972)
Khanyi Dhlomo, magazine editor (born 1975)
Laurence Gandar, Rand Daily Mail editor (1915–1998)
Niel Hammann, editor of magazines (born 1937)
John Tengo Jabavu, political activist and newspaper editor (1859–1921)
Aggrey Klaaste, journalist and editor (1940–2004)
Max du Preez, newspaper editor (born 1951)

Poets
See also: South African poets and Afrikaans language poets

Roy Campbell, poet (1901–1957)
Judy Croome, poet (born 1958)
Sheila Cussons, poet (1922–2004)
Jonty Driver (born 1939)
Jakob Daniël du Toit, poet a.k.a. Totius (1877–1953)
Elisabeth Eybers, poet (1915–2007)
Stephen Gray, writer and poet (1941–2020)
Ingrid Jonker, poet (1933–1965)
Antjie Krog, poet, novelist and playwright (born 1952)
Laurence Lerner, poet (1925–2016)
Lucas Malan, Afrikaans academic and poet (1946–2010)
Chris Mann, poet (1948–2021)
Eugène Nielen Marais, poet, writer, lawyer and naturalist (1871–1936)
Thomas Pringle, poet and journalist (1789–1834)
N.S. Puleng, poet and author (born 1958)
N. P. van Wyk Louw, poet (1906–1970)
Mongane Wally Serote, poet, activist and politician (born 1944)
Stephen Watson, poet (1954–2011)

Journalists

Jani Allan, journalist and radio personality (born 1953)
George Claassen, journalist (born 1949)
Robyn Curnow, CNN television reporter and anchor
John Charles Daly, television journalist, executive and game show host (1914–1991)
Arnold S de Beer, journalist and academic (1942–2021)
Frene Ginwala, journalist and politician (born 1932)
Arthur Goldstuck, journalist (born 1959)
Niel Hammann, journalist (born 1937)
Noni Jabavu, journalit, editor and the first black South African woman to publish an autobiography (1919 - 2008) 
Archibald Campbell Jordan (1906–1968)
Lara Logan, CBS television reporter/correspondent (born 1971)
Peter Magubane, South African photographer (born 1932) 
John Matisonn, print and radio journalist for both South African and United States broadcasters (born 1949)
Zakes Mda, journalist (born 1948)
Nathaniel Ndazana Nakasa, South African journalist and short story writer (1937–1965)
Sam Nzima, South African photographer, who took image of Hector Pieterson for the Soweto uprising (1934–2018)
Henry Nxumalo, investigative journalist under apartheid (1917–1957)
Sol Plaatje, journalist and political activist (1877–1932)
Percy Qoboza, journalist, editorial writer, and political activist (1938–1988)
Barry Streek, journalist, political activist, author, parliamentary media manager (1948–2006)
Redi Tlhabi, journalist and broadcaster (born 1978)
Eric Lloyd Williams, journalist and war correspondent (1915–1988)
Donald Woods, journalist and anti-apartheid activist (1933–2001)

Artist

Performing artists

Actors / Actresses

Anel Alexander, actress, producer (born 1979)
Lesley – Ann Brandt, South African born actress, notable for her role as Mazikeen in the show Lucifer (born 1981)
Ayanda Borotho, actress (born 1981)
Ivan Botha, actor (born 1984)
Kai Luke Brümmer, actor (born 1993)
Presley Chweneyagae, actor (born 1984)
Peter Cartwright, actor (1935–2013)
Baby Cele, actress (born 1972)
Sharlto Copley, actor, (District 9) (born 1973)
Katlego Danke, actress (born 1978)
Embeth Davidtz, actress (born 1965)
Gopala Davies, actor and director (born 1988)
Ryan de Villiers, actor (born 1992)
Sindi Dlathu, actress (born 1974)
Pallance Dladla, actor (born 1992)
Lillian Dube, South African actress (born 1945)
Vinette Ebrahim, actress (born 1957)
Kim Engelbrecht, actress (born 1980)
Willie Esterhuizen, actor
Connie Ferguson, actress (born 1970)
Shona Ferguson, actor (1972–2021)
Brett Goldin, actor (1977–2006)
Zoe Gail, actress (1920–2020)
Gugu Gumede, actress (born 1991)
Roxane Hayward, actress (born 1991)
Hennie Jacobs, actor (born 1981)
David James, actor, stage, television, and film actor (born 1972)
Sid James, film & television actor (1913–1976)
Glynis Johns, actress (born 1923)
Adhir Kalyan, actor (born 1983)
Atandwa Kani, actor (born 1984)
John Kani, actor, entertainer and writer (born 1943)
Dawn Thandeka King, actress (born 1977)
Shannon Kook (born 1987)
Paballo Koza, actor (born 2002)
Alice Krige, actress (born 1954)
Deon Lotz, actor (born 1964)
Sello Maake Ka-Ncube, actor (born 1960)
Gail Mabalane, actress (born 1984)
Joe Mafela, actor, writer and singer (1942–2017)
Maps Maponyane, actor (born 1990)
Warren Masemola, actor (born 1983)
Khanyi Mbau, radio and television personality and actress notable for Happiness Is a Four-letter Word (born 1985)
Nomzamo Mbatha, actress (born 1990)
Michelle Mosalakae, actress (born 1994)
Thuso Mbedu, actress (born 1991)
Sean Michael (South African actor), (born 1969)
Enhle Mbali Mlotshwa, actress (born 1988)
Masoja Msiza, actor (born 1964)
Patrick Mynhardt, actor (1932–2007)
Themba Ndaba, actor (born 1965)
Menzi Ngubane, actor (born 1967)
Jessica Nkosi, actress (born 1990)
Kenneth Nkosi, actor (born 1973)
Winnie Ntshaba, actress (born 1975)
Winston Ntshona, actor (1941–2018)
Nandi Nyembe, South African actress (born 1950)
Tanit Phoenix, actress (Death Race: Inferno, Lord of War, Safe House, Femme Fatales, Mad Buddies) (born 1984)
Terry Pheto, actress (born 1981)
Sasha Pieterse, actress (born 1996)
Madelaine Petsch, actress (born 1994)
Sandra Prinsloo, South African actress (The Gods Must Be Crazy, Quest for Love) (born 1947)
Ama Qamata, actress (born 1998)
Basil Rathbone, actor (1892–1967)
Jo-anne Reyneke, actress (born 1988)
Ian Roberts, actor, playwright, singer (born 1952)
Angelique Rockas pioneer of multi-racial theatre in the UK (born 1951)
Buhle Samuels
Stelio Savante, actor (born 1970)
Clive Scott, actor (1937–2021)
Rapulana Seiphemo, actor (born 1967)
Cliff Severn, actor (1925–2014)
Raymond Severn, actor (1930–1994)
Antony Sher, actor, author and painter (1949–2021)
Cliff Simon, actor (1962-2021)
William Smith, TV teacher and presenter (born 1939)
Linda Sokhulu, actress (born 1976)
Shaleen Surtie-Richards, actress (1955–2021)
Janet Suzman, actress (born 1939)
Reine Swart, actress, producer 
Charlize Theron, actress (born 1975)
Pearl Thusi, actress, model, MC (born 1988)
Siyabonga Thwala, actor (born 1969)
Pieter-Dirk Uys, political satirist and entertainer (born 1945)
Brümilda van Rensburg, actress (born 1956)
Musetta Vander, actress (born 1969)
Arnold Vosloo, actor (The Mummy, The Mummy Returns, 24) (born 1962)

Dancers
 Juliet Prowse, dancer (1936–1996)
 Bontle Modiselle, dancer (born 1990)

Playwrights and film directors
Neill Blomkamp, director, District 9 (born 1979)
Charles J. Fourie, playwright (born 1965)
Athol Fugard, playwright (born 1932)
Ronald Harwood, playwright and writer (1934–2020)
Oliver Hermanus, film director and writer (born 1983)
Gavin Hood, film director, wrote and directed the Academy Award-winning Tsotsi (2005) (born 1963)
Rob De Mezieres, film director and writer
Mbongeni Ngema, playwright, actor, choreographer and director (born 1955)
Michael Oblowitz film director (born 1952)
Mthuli ka Shezi, playwright and political activist (1947–1972)
Leon Schuster, filmmaker, comedian, actor and prankster (born 1951)
Jamie Uys, film director (1921–1996)

Singers, musicians and composers

AKA (rapper), South African Kiernan Forbes (1988–2023)
Zain Bhikha, world-renowned singer-songwriter of the Nasheed genre
Michael Blake, classical composer (born 1951)
Johan Botha, opera singer (1965–2016)
Al Bowlly, popular singer (1898–1941)
Don Clarke, Singer-songwriter (born 1955)
Johnny Clegg, musician (1953–2019)
Mimi Coertse, opera singer (born 1932)
Fanie de Jager, operatic tenor (born 1949)
Lucky Dube, reggae singer (1964–2007)
Brenda Fassie, anti-apartheid Afropop singer, songwriter, dancer and activist (1964–2004)
Daniel Friedman ("Deep Fried Man"), musical comedian (born 1981)
Steve Kekana, singer and songwriter (1958–2021)
Jabu Khanyile, musician and lead vocalist (1957–2006)
Claire Johnston, singer (born 1967)
David Kramer, singer and playwright (born 1951)
Clare Loveday, classical composer (born 1967)
Lira (singer), singer (born 1979)
Sipho Mabuse, singer (born 1951)
Ringo Madlingozi, South African singer, songwriter, producer, and member of parliament (born 1964)
Arthur Mafokate, kwaito musician and producer (born 1962)
Winston Ngozi Mankunku, tenor sax player (1943–2009)
Mahlathini, mbaqanga singer (1938–1999)
Miriam Makeba, singer and civil rights activist (1932–2008)
Rebecca Malope, multi-award-winning South African gospel singer (born 1968)
Manfred Mann, musician (born 1940)
Hugh Masekela, jazz trumpeter and singer (1939–2018)
Gwendolyn Masin, violinist, author, pedagogue (born 1977)
Lebo Mathosa, popular South African kwaito singer (1977–2006)
Dave Matthews, leader of the Dave Matthews Band (born 1967)
Shaun Morgan, lead singer of the award-winning band Seether (born 1978)
Ray Phiri, jazz, fusion and Mbhaqanga musician (1947–2017)
Aquiles Priester, drummer (born 1971)
Rex Rabanye, jazz, fusion and soulful pop musician (1944–2010)
Trevor Rabin, musician, composer, former member of progressive rock band Yes (born 1954)
Koos Ras, comedian, singer, writer, composer (1928–1997)
Charles Segal (pianist), composer, arranger, Guinness World Record holder (born 1929)
Enoch Sontonga, composer of national anthem (1873–1905)
Joseph Shabalala, founder and director of Ladysmith Black Mambazo (1941–2020)
ZP Theart, singer, ex Dragonforce (born 1975)
Costa Titch, Amapiano rapper and dancer  (1995–2023) 
Hilda Tloubatla, lead singer of Mahotella Queens (born 1942)
Watkin Tudor Jones, rapper, performance artist, band member of Die Antwoord (born 1974)
Arnold van Wyk, classical composer (1916–1983)
Yolandi Visser, rapper, performance artist, band member of Die Antwoord (born 1984)
Amor Vittone, singer, performing artist and gold-disc recording artist (born 1972)
Kevin Volans, classical composer (born 1949)

Models, socialites and media personalities
Jani Allan, radio personality, journalist (born 1953)
Gina Athans, model, international socialite (born 1984)
Riaan Cruywagen, TV news reader (born 1945)
Lasizwe Dambuza, television personality (born 1998)
Belle Delphine, Social Media Personality (born 1999)
Trevor Denman, horse racing announcer (born 1952)
Minnie Dlamini, TV presenter, TV personality, model and actress (born 1990)
Jade Fairbrother, model, fitness bikini competitor, Playboy Playmate (born 1986)
Watkin Tudor Jones (Ninja) singer, rapper, actor, director (born 1974)
Roxy Ingram, model (born 1982)
Alan Khan, radio and television personality (born 1971)
Caspar Lee, YouTube personality and actor (born 1994)
Jeremy Maggs, journalist, radio host and television presenter (born 1961)
Jeremy Mansfield, radio and TV personality
Maps Maponyane, media socialite, model and actor (born 1990)
Robert Marawa, sports journalist, television and radio personality (born 1973)
Megan McKenzie, model (born 1980)
Trevor Noah, comedian, actor, radio- and television host (born 1984)
Debora Patta, broadcast journalist and television producer (born 1964)
Tanit Phoenix, Sports Illustrated model and actress (born 1984)
Lunga Shabalala, TV presenter, model and actor (born 1989)
Linda Sibiya, radio personality, radio producer, television host, television producer and broadcaster.
Troye Sivan, YouTube personality, actor and singer (born 1995)
Reeva Steenkamp, model (1983–2013)
Candice Swanepoel, Victoria's Secret model (born 1988)
Charlize Theron, actress, film producer (born 1975)
Lesego Tlhabi, comedian and satirist (as Coconut Kelz) (born 1988)
Yolandi Visser singer, rapper, actor (born 1984)
Minki van der Westhuizen, model and TV presenter (born 1984)
Eddie Zondi, radio personality and music composer (1967–2014)

Visual Artists

Cartoonists
T.O. Honiball, cartoonist (1905–1990)
Jeremy Nell, cartoonist (born 1979)
Zapiro, cartoonist (born 1958)

Painters

Thomas Baines, colonial painter and explorer (1820–1875)
Leon Botha, painter and disc jockey (1985–2011)
Garth Erasmus, visual artist (born 1956)
Clinton Fein, artist, activist, photographer (born 1964)
C. G. Finch-Davies, painter and ornithologist (1875–1920)
Ronald Harrison, painter (1940–2011)
William Kentridge, painter (born 1955)
Maggie Laubser, painter (1886–1973)
Neville Lewis, artist (1895–1972)
Esther Mahlangu, painter (born 1935)
Ernest Mancoba, avant-garde artist (1904–2002)
Judith Mason, artist (1938 - 2016) 
Conor Mccreedy, artist (born 1987)
Brett Murray, artist (born 1961)
Charles Ernest Peers, painter (born 1875)
George Pemba, visual artist (1912–2001)
Jacobus Hendrik Pierneef, artist (1886–1957)
Gerard Sekoto, artist and musician (1913–1993)
Cecil Skotnes, painter (1926–2009)
Irma Stern, painter (1894–1966)
Vladimir Tretchikoff, painter (1913–2006)

Photographers
Kevin Carter (1961–1994)
Ernest Cole (1940–1990)
Caroline Gibello (born 1974)
David Goldblatt, photographer (1930–2018)
Bob Gosani (1934–1972)
Alf Kumalo (1930–2012)
Peter Magubane (born 1932)
Jürgen Schadeberg (1931–2020)
Austin Stevens (born 1951)

Sculptors
Anton van Wouw (1862–1945)

Performance Artists
Steven Cohen (born 1962)
Tracey Rose (born 1974)

Architects

 Herbert Baker (1862–1946)
 Gerard Moerdijk (1890–1958)

Business

Raymond Ackerman, businessman (born 1931)
Barney Barnato, mining magnate (1852–1897)
Roelof Botha, venture capitalist and company director (born 1973)
David Brink, businessman (born 1939)
John Fairbairn, founder of Mutual Life (1794–1864)
Vanessa Gounden, South Africa's richest businesswoman (born 1961)
Morris Kahn, Israeli billionaire, founder and chairman of Aurec Group (born 1930)
Sol Kerzner, hotel magnate (1935–2020)
Basetsana Kumalo, former Miss South Africa, presenter and businesswoman (born 1974)
Richard Maponya, richest business man, former owner of Maponya Mall; founder and first president of the National African Federated Chamber of Commerce (NAFCOC) (1920–2020)
Sammy Marks, businessman (1844–1920)
Nthato Motlana, prominent South African businessman, physician and anti-apartheid activist (1925–2008)
Bridgette Motsepe, businesswoman (born 1960)
Patrice Motsepe, businessman (born 1962)
Elon Musk, Internet and space launch entrepreneur (born 1971)
Phiwa Nkambule, Co-founder and CEO of Riovic, founder of Cybatar (born 1992)
Harry Oppenheimer, businessman (1908–2000)
William G. Pietersen, international businessman, CEO, author, professor (born 1937)
Charles Purdon, agricultural pioneer (1838–1926)
Mamphela Ramphele, political activist, academic, businesswoman and mother to the son of Steve Biko (born 1947)
Cyril Ramaphosa, politician and businessman (born 1952)
George Rex, pioneer entrepreneur of the Southern Cape (1765–1839)
Cecil Rhodes, businessman (1853–1902)
Anton Rupert, businessman and conservationist (1916–2006)
Johann Rupert, businessman, son of Anton Rupert (born 1950)
Tokyo Sexwale, politician and businessman (born 1953)
Mark Shuttleworth, web entrepreneur, founder of Thawte and Ubuntu Linux, space tourist (born 1973)
Nicky Newton-King, first female CEO of JSE from 2012 to 2019 (born 1966)

Legal, police and military

Lourens Ackermann, constitutional court judge (born 1934)
Ismail Ayob, lawyer (born 1942)
Vernon Berrangé, human rights advocate (1900–1983)
George Bizos, lawyer (1927–2020)
Louis Botha, Boer War General, captured Winston Churchill during the Second Boer War, also one of the signatories of the Treaty of Vereeniging (1862–1919)
Annie Botha, philanthropist and civic leader, wife of Louis Botha
Arthur Chaskalson, judge (1931–2012)
Piet Cronjé, Boer general and commander-in-chief of ZAR's military forces (1840–1911)
Beric John Croome, chartered accountant (South Africa), Advocate of the High Court of South Africa, PhD, tax law author and pioneer in taxpayers' rights in South Africa (1960–2019)
Garnet de la Hunt, the Chief Scout of the Boy Scouts of South Africa, Vice-Chairman of the Africa Scout Committee, and South African World Scout Committee (1933–2014)
Koos de la Rey, Boer general (1847–1914)
Pierre de Vos, constitutional law scholar (born 1963)
Christiaan Rudolph de Wet, Boer general and acting President of the Orange Free State (1854–1922)
Johannes Christiaan de Wet, legal academic (1912–1990)
Bram Fischer, advocate QC and political activist (1908–1975)
Richard Goldstone, ex-constitutional court judge (born 1938)
Harold Hanson, advocate QC (1904–1973)
Sydney Kentridge, former advocate of the Supreme Court and Acting Justice of the Constitutional Court (born 1922)
Mervyn E. King, former judge of the Supreme Court of South Africa and chairman of the King Committee on Corporate Governance (born 1937)
Joel Joffe, Baron Joffe, CBE lawyer and Labour peer in the House of Lords (1932–2017)
Pius Langa, former chief justice of constitutional court (1939–2013)
Magnus Malan, minister of defence and chief of the South African Defence Force (1930–2011)
Cecil Margo, judge (1915–2000)
Richard Mdluli, head of Police Crime Intelligence (born 1958)
Dunstan Mlambo, Judge President of the Gauteng Division of the High Court of South Africa (born 1960)
Mogoeng Mogoeng, Chief Justice of South Africa (born 1961)
Yvonne Mokgoro, former justice of the Constitutional Court of South Africa (born 1950) 
Phetogo Molawa, first black female helicopter pilot in the South African Air Force and the South African National Defence Force
Sandile Ngcobo, former Chief Justice of South Africa (born 1953)
Bulelani Ngcuka, director of public prosecutions (born 1954)
Marmaduke Pattle, highest scoring Allied Air Ace of World War Two (1914–1941)
Riah Phiyega, national police commissioner
Vejaynand Ramlakan, South African military commander (1957–2020)
Barry Roux, defence advocate who has represented Oscar Pistorius, Dave King and Lothar Neethling (born 1955)
Albie Sachs, justice in constitutional court (born 1935)
Harry Heinz Schwarz, lawyer (1924–2010)
Jackie Selebi, national commissioner of police (1950–2015)
Thembile Skweyiya, South African Constitutional Court judge (1939–2015)
Percy Sonn, former head of the Directorate of Special Operations (1947–2007)
Sir Robert Clarkson Tredgold, Chief Justice of the Federation of Rhodesia and Nyasaland (1899–1977)
Percy Yutar, South Africa's first Jewish attorney-general and prosecutor of Nelson Mandela in the 1963 Rivonia Treason Trial (1911–2002)

Political

Activists and trade unionists

Elizabeth 'Nanna' Abrahams, political activist and trade unionist (1925–2008)
Zackie Achmat, AIDS activist (born 1962)
Neil Aggett, political activist and trade unionist (1953–1982)
Neville Alexander, revolutionary and proponent of a multilingual South Africa (1936–2012)
Abdul Kader Asmal, South African politician (1934–2011)
Abu Baker Asvat, founding member of Azapo (1943–1989)
Zainab Asvat, South African anti-apartheid activist (1920–2013)
Frances Baard, trade unionist, organiser for the African National Congress Women's League and a Patron of the United Democratic Front (1909–1997)
Esther Barsel, South African political activist, long-standing member of the South African Communist Party and wife to Hymie Barsel (1924–2008)
Hymie Barsel, South African activist (1920–1987)
Jeremy Baskin, trade unionist (born 1956)
Jean Bernadt, anti-apartheid activist (1914–2011)
Lionel Bernstein, anti-apartheid activist and political prisoner (1920–2002)
Edward Bhengu, founder member of the PAC (1934–2010)
Sibusiso Bengu, politician (born 1934)
Steve Biko, nonviolent political activist (1946–1977)
Sonia Bunting, journalist, political and anti-apartheid activist (1922–2001)
Amina Cachalia, South African anti-Apartheid activist, women's rights activist, and politician (1930–2013)
Ismail Ahmed Cachalia, South African political activist and a leader of Transvaal Indian Congress and the African National Congress (1908–2003)
Fort Calata, political activist and one of The Cradock Four (1956–1985)
James Calata, political activist and ANC secretary (1895–1983)
Collins Chabane, South African Minister of Public Service and Administration (1960–2015)
Laloo Chiba, South African politician and revolutionary (1930–2017)
Yusuf Mohamed Dadoo, South African Communist and an anti-apartheid activist (1909–1983)
Eddie Daniels, anti-apartheid activist (1928–2017)
Nosipho Dastile, community and anti-Apartheid activist (1938–2009)
Sophia De Bruyn, political activist (born 1938)
Amina Desai, political prisoner (1920–2009)
Lilian Diedericks, South African activist (1925–2021)
Bettie du Toit, trade unionist and anti-apartheid activist (1910–2002)
Ebrahim Ismail Ebrahim, South African anti-apartheid activist (1937–2021)
Colin Eglin, South African politician (1925–2013)
Farid Esack, political activist and opposition to apartheid (born 1959)
Lucinda Evans, women's right activist (born 1972)
Ruth First, South African anti-apartheid activist, scholar and wife to Joe Slovo (1925–1982)
Pregs Govender, human rights activist, former ANC MP, anti-apartheid campaigner (born 1960)
Irene Grootboom, housing rights activist (c. 1969–2008)
Denis Goldberg, political activist (1933–2020)
Arthur Goldreich, abstract painter and anti-apartheid (1929–2011)
John Gomomo, South African Unionist and activist (1945–2008)
Matthew Goniwe, political activist and one of the Cradock four (1946–1985)
Joe Nzingo Gqabi, political activist (1929–1981)
Josiah Tshangana Gumede, political activist (1867–1946)
Harry Gwala, revolutionary leader in the African National Congress and South African Communist Party (1920–1995)
Nkululeko Gwala, prominent member of the shackdwellers' social movement Abahlali baseMjondolo (died 2013)
Alcott Skei Gwentshe, shopkeeper and political activist (died 1966)
Bertha Gxowa, anti-apartheid, women's rights activist and trade unionist (1934–2010)
Chris Hani, political activist (1942–1993)
Harold Hanson, politician and advocate (1904–1973)
Frederick John Harris, South African schoolteacher and anti-apartheid (1937–1965)
Abdullah Haron, South African Muslim cleric and anti-apartheid activist (1924–1969)
Ruth Hayman, anti-apartheid campaigner (1913–1981)
Alexander Hepple, trade unionist, politician, anti-apartheid activist and author and the last leader of the original South African Labour Party (1904–1983)
Bob Hepple, political activist, leader in the fields of labour law, equality and human rights (1934–2015)
Bavelile Gloria Hlongwa, South African chemical engineer and politician (1981–2019)
Bantu Holomisa, political activist (born 1955)
Timothy Peter Jenkin, anti-apartheid activist, political prisoner and writer (born 1948)
Helen Joseph, anti-apartheid activist (1905–1992)
Mthuli ka Shezi, South African playwright, political activist (1947–1972)
James Kantor, politician, lawyer and writer (1927–1974)
Ahmed Kathrada, political activist (1929–2017)
Philip Kgosana, political activist (1936–2017)
Winnie Kgware, anti-Apartheid activist (1917–1998)
Alice Kinloch (born 1863), human rights activist and writer
Wolfie Kodesh, South African Communist party activist (1918–2002)
Moses Kotane, anti-apartheid activist (1907–1978)
Ashley Kriel, South African activist (1966–1987)
 Duma Kumalo, South African human rights activist and one of the Sharpeville Six (died 2006)
 Dumisani Kumalo, South African politician (1947–2019)
Ellen Kuzwayo, political activist (1914–2006)
Lennox Lagu, political activist (1938—2011)
Stephen Bernard Lee, anti-apartheid and political prisoner (born 1951)
Anton Lembede, political activist (1914–1947)
Moses Mabhida, anti-apartheid activist (1923–1986)
Phakamile Mabija, anti-apartheid activist (died 1977)
Winnie Madikizela-Mandela, political activist and former 2nd wife to Nelson Mandela (1936–2018)
Zacharias Richard Mahabane, political activist (1881–1971)
Mac Maharaj, political activist (born 1935)
Solomon Mahlangu, Umkhonto we Sizwe operative (1956–1979)
Vusumzi Make, political activist (1931–2006)
Sefako Makgatho, political activist (1861–1951)
Mbuyisa Makhubo, anti-Apartheid activist (born 1957/1958)
Clarence Makwetu, political activist (1928–2016)
Adolph Malan, fighter pilot and civil rights activist (1910–1963)
Zollie Malindi, political activist (1924–2008)
Nelson Mandela, political activist and first President of South Africa (1918–2013)
Mosibudi Mangena, South Africa politician (born 1947)
Isaac Lesiba Maphotho, political activist (1931–2019)
J. B. Marks, politician activist (1903–1972)
Jafta Jeff Masemola, political activist (1929–1990)
Emma Mashinini, trade unionist and political leader (1929–2017)
Tsietsi Mashinini, South African anti-Apartheid activist and student leader of the Soweto uprising on 16 June 1976 (1957–1990)
Joseph Mathunjwa, Trade union leader and the head of the Association of Mineworkers and Construction Union (AMCU) (born 1965)
Florence Matomela, South African anti-pass law activist (1910–1969)
Joe Matthews, political activist and son of ZK Matthews (1929–2010)
Z. K. Matthews, political activist (1901–1968)
Seth Mazibuko, youngest member of the South African Students' Organisation that planned and led the Soweto uprising
Epainette Mbeki, political activist, mother of Thabo Mbeki and wife to Govan Mbeki (1916–2014)
Govan Mbeki, political activist and father of Thabo Mbeki (1910–2001)
Robert McBride, anti-apartheid assassin and later police chief (born 1963)
A. P. Mda, co-founder of the African National Congress Youth League (ANCYL) and Pan Africanist Congress of Azania (1916–1993)
Fatima Meer, scientist and political activist (1928–2010)
Raymond Mhlaba, political activist and the former Premier of the Eastern Cape (1920–2005)
Sicelo Mhlauli, political activist and one of the Cradock four (1952–1985)
Jean Middleton, anti-apartheid activist and wife to Harold Strachan (1928–2010)
Clarence Mini, anti-apartheid activist (1951–2020)
Vuyisile Mini, unionist and Umkhonto we Sizwe activist (1920–1964)
Nomhlangano Beauty Mkhize, political activist, shop steward and wife to Saul Mkhize (1946–1977)
Sparrow Mkhonto, political activist and one of the Cradock four (1951–1985)
Wilton Mkwayi, political activist (1923–2004)
Johnson Mlambo, political activist (1940–2021)
Andrew Mlangeni, political activist (1925–2020)
Thamsanga Mnyele, anti-apartheid (1948–1985)
Billy Modise, political activist (1930–2018)
Joe Modise, political activist (1929–2001)
Thabo Edwin Mofutsanyana, political activist (1899–1995)
Mapetla Mohapi, political activist (1947–1976)
Yunus Mohamed, (sometimes Mahomed) South African lawyer and activist (1950–2008)
Peter Mokaba, political activist (1959–2002)
Priscilla Mokaba, political activist and mother of Peter Mokaba (died 2013)
Ruth Mompati, political activist (1925–2015)
Moosa Moolla, political activist (born 1934)
Rahima Moosa, anti-apartheid activist (1922–1993)
James Moroka, political activist (1891–1985)
Zephania Mothopeng, political activist (1913–1990)
Nthato Motlana, physician and anti-apartheid activist (1925–2008)
Caroline Motsoaledi, political activist and wife to Elias Motsoaledi (died c.2015)
Elias Motsoaledi, political activist (1924–1994)
James Mpanza, political activist (1889–1970)
Oscar Mpetha, political activist and unionist (1909–1994)
Griffiths Mxenge, anti-apartheid activist (1935–1981)
Victoria Mxenge, anti-apartheid activist (1942–1985)
Monty Naicker, South African anti-apartheid activist and medical doctor (1910–1978)
Ama Naidoo, anti-apartheid activist (1908–1993)
Billy Nair, political activist (1929–2008)
Rita Ndzanga, anti-apartheid activist and trade unionist (1933–2022)
Mary Ngalo, South African anti-apartheid activist and was also active in fighting for women's rights (died 1973)
Lilian Ngoyi, anti-apartheid activist (1911–1980)
Looksmart Ngudle, political activist (1922–1963)
Joe Nhlanhla, African National Congress national executive and the former South African Minister of Justice (Intelligence Affairs) (1936–2008)
John Nkadimeng, politician and anti-apartheid activist (1927–2020)
Vernon Nkadimeng, political activist (1958–1985)
Nkwenkwe Nkomo, SASO nine member
William Frederick Nkomo, medical doctor, community leader, political activist and teacher (1915–1972) 
Duma Nokwe, political activist (1927–1978)
Jabulile Nyawose, trade unionist and anti-apartheid activist (died 1982)
Alfred Nzo, political activist (1925–2000)
Albert Nzula, political activist (1905–1934)
Abdullah Mohamed Omar, anti-Apartheid activist and lawyer (1934–2004)
Roy Padayachie, politician and Minister of Public Service and Administration of the Republic of South Africa (1950–2012)
Aziz Pahad, political activist (born 1940)
Essop Pahad, political activist (born 1939)
Sabelo Phama, revolutionary (1949–1994)
Motsoko Pheko, politician, lawyer, author, historian, theologian and academic (born 1933)
Joyce Piliso-Seroke, South-African educator, activist, feminist and community organizer (born 1933)
Sol Plaatje, political activist (1876–1932)
John Nyathi Pokela, political activist (1922/1923–1985)
Maggie Resha, political activist and wife of Robert Resha (1923–2003)
Robert Resha, political activist (1920–1978)
Walter Rubusana, first deputy president of the ANC (1856–1936)
Albie Sachs, political activist (born 1935)
Harry Schwarz, South African lawyer, statesman and long-time political opposition leader against apartheid in South Africa (1924–2010)
Jackie Sedibe, South African National Defence Force (SANDF) Major General and politician activist and wife to Joe Modise (born 1945)
Molefi Sefularo, Deputy Minister of Health (1957–2010)
James Seipei, teenage United Democratic Front (UDF) activist (1974–1989)
Nimrod Sejake, labour leader in South Africa, leading member of the Congress of South African Trade Unions and secretary of the Iron Steel Workers (1920–2004)
Reggie September, activist (1923–2013)
Gertrude Shope, South African trade unionist and politician (born 1925)
Gert Sibande, political activist (1907–1987)
Archie Sibeko, political activist and trade unionist (1928–2018)
David Sibeko, South Africa politician and journalist (1938–1979)
Letitia Sibeko, political activist and wife to Archie Sibeko (1930–??)
Joyce Nomafa Sikakane, South African journalist and activist (born 1943)
Annie Silinga, South African anti-pass laws and anti-apartheid political activist (1910–1984)
Jack Simons, political activist (1907–1995)
Rachel Simons, communist and trade unionist and wife to Jack Simons (1914–2004)
Albertina Sisulu, political activist and wife of Walter Sisulu (1918–2011)
Walter Sisulu, political activist (1912–2003)
Zola Skweyiya, political activist (1942–2018)
Joe Slovo, South African politician, and an opponent of the apartheid system (1926–1995) 
Robert Sobukwe, political activist and founder of PAC (1924–1978)
Veronica Sobukwe, political activist and wife to Robert Sobukwe (1927–2018)
Makhenkesi Stofile, political activist (1944–2016)
Harold Strachan, anti-apartheid activist (1925–2020)
Helen Suzman, South African anti-apartheid activist and politician (1917–2009)
Isaac Bangani Tabata, political activist (1909–1990)
Dora Tamana, South African anti-apartheid activist (1901–1983)
Adelaide Tambo political activist and wife to Oliver Tambo (1929–2007)
Oliver Tambo, political activist (1917–1993)
Mary Thipe, anti-apartheid and human rights activist (1917–2002)
Mohammed Tikly, South African educator and struggle veteran (1939–2020)
Ahmed Timol, anti-apartheid activist, political leader and activist in the underground South African Communist Party (SACP) (1941–1971)
Abram Onkgopotse Tiro, South African student political activist (1945–1974)
Steve Tshwete, political activist (1938–2002)
Ben Turok, anti-apartheid activist and Economics Professor (1927–2019)
Moses Twebe, South African politician (1916–2013)
Zwelinzima Vavi, former general secretary of COSATU, and Trade union leader SAFTU (born 1962)
Randolph Vigne, anti-apartheid activist (1928–2016)
Sheila Weinberg, anti-apartheid activist (1945–2004)
AnnMarie Wolpe, sociologist, feminist, anti-apartheid activist and wife to Harold Wolpe (1930–2018)
Harold Wolpe, lawyer, sociologist, political economist and anti-apartheid activist (1926–1996)
Khoisan X, political activist (1955–2010)
Alfred Xuma, political activist and ANC president (1893–1962)
Tony Yengeni, anti-Apartheid activist (born 1954)

Apartheid operatives

Wouter Basson, apartheid scientist (born 1950)
Dirk Coetzee, apartheid covert operative (1945–2013)
Eugene de Kock, apartheid assassin (born 1949)
Clive Derby-Lewis, assassin and former parliamentarian (1936–2016)
Jimmy Kruger, apartheid Minister of Justice and the Police (1917–1987)
Lothar Neethling, apartheid forensic scientist (1935–2005)
Barend Strydom, convicted murderer and white supremacist activist (born 1965)
Eugène Terre'Blanche, white supremacist activist (1941–2010)
Adriaan Vlok, apartheid Minister of Law and Order (born 1937)
Craig Williamson, apartheid spy (born 1949)

Colonial and Union Governors

George Grey, Cape governor (1812–1898)
Jan Willem Janssens, Cape Governor (1762–1838)
 Benjamin d'Urban, Cape Governor (1834–1837)
Benjamin Pine, Natal governor (1809–1891)
Harry Smith, Cape governor 1847–52 (1787–1860)
Andries Stockenström, governor of British Kaffraria (1792–1864)
Simon van der Stel, first Cape governor (1639–1712)
Willem Adriaan van der Stel, second Cape governor (1664–1723)
Jan van Riebeeck, founder of Cape settlement (1619–1677)
Nicolaas Jacobus de Wet, Chief Justice of South Africa and acting Governor-General (1873–1960)

Leaders and politicians

Ken Andrew, politician (born 1943)
Kader Asmal, an activist, politician and professor of human rights (1934–2011)
Sibusiso Bengu, politician (born 1934)
Steve Biko, nonviolent political activist (1946–1977)
Thozamile Botha, politician (born 1948)
Cheryl Carolus, politician (born 1958)
Yusuf Dadoo, doctor and politician (1909–1983)
Patricia de Lille, politician (born 1951)
Nkosazana Dlamini-Zuma, politician (born 1949)
John Langalibalele Dube, founder and first president of ANC (1871–1946)
Abba Eban, Israeli diplomat and politician, and President of the Weizmann Institute of Science (1915–2002)
De Villiers Graaff, United Party opposition leader (1913–1999)
Jan Hendrik Hofmeyr, journalist and politician (1845–1909)
Jan Hendrik Hofmeyr, academic and politician (1894–1948)
Danny Jordaan, politician and soccer administrator (born 1951)
Tony Leon, DA opposition leader (born 1956)
Albert Luthuli, President of the African National Congress, 1952–67 (1898–1967)
Winnie Madikizela-Mandela, politician and second wife of Nelson Mandela (1936–2018)
Trevor Manuel, minister of finance (born 1956)
Lindiwe Mazibuko, former Parliamentary Leader for the opposition Democratic Alliance (born 1980)
Govan Mbeki, political activist and father of Thabo Mbeki (1910–2001)
Roelf Meyer, politician and businessman (born 1947)
Raymond Mhlaba, political activist and the former Premier of the Eastern Cape (1920–2005)
Vuyisile Mini, unionist and Umkhonto we Sizwe activist (1920–1964)
Johnson Mlambo, political activist (1940–2021)
Phumzile Mlambo-Ngcuka, deputy president (born 1955)
Pieter Mulder, leader of the Freedom Front Plus and former deputy minister of agriculture (born 1951)
Gagathura (Monty) Mohambry Naicker, medical doctor and politician (1910–1978)
Bulelani Ngcuka, politician (born 1954)
Dullah Omar, politician (1934–2004)
Andries Pretorius, Boer leader and commandant-general (1799–1853)
Deneys Reitz, boer commando, deputy Prime Minister and High Commissioner to London (1882–1944)
Pixley ka Isaka Seme, ANC founder member (1881–1951)
Mbhazima Shilowa, trade unionist and premier (born 1958)
Walter Sisulu, political activist (1912–2003)
Ruth First-Slovo, political activist and wife to Joe Slovo (1924–1982)
Joe Slovo, politician (1926–1995)
Harry Schwarz, lawyer, politician, ambassador to United States and anti-apartheid leader (1924–2010)
Robert Sobukwe, political activist and founder of PAC (1924–1978)
Helen Suzman, politician (1917–2009)
Oliver Tambo, political activist (1917–1993)
Catherine Taylor, politician (1914–1992)
Frederik van Zyl Slabbert, PFP opposition leader (1940–2010)
Helen Zille, former DA opposition leader, former premier of the Western Cape (born 1951)
Jacob Zuma, former president (born 1942)

Prime Ministers and presidents

Jacobus Boshoff, 2nd President of the Orange Free State (1808–1881)
Louis Botha, Boer commander-in-chief and 1st Prime Minister of South Africa (1862–1919)
Pieter Willem Botha, 9th and last Prime Minister and 8th State President of South Africa (1916–2006)
Johannes Henricus Brand, 4th President of the Orange Free State (1823–1888)
Thomas François Burgers, 4th President of South African Republic (1871–1877)
Schalk Willem Burger, 6th and last President of South African Republic (1852–1918)
Frederik Willem de Klerk, 9th and last State President of South Africa (1990–1994) and joint Nobel Peace Prize winner (1936–2021)
Nicolaas Johannes Diederichs, 4th State President of South Africa (1903–1978)
Jacobus Johannes Fouché, 3rd State President of South Africa (1898–1980)
James Barry Munnik Hertzog, Boer general and 3rd Prime Minister of South Africa (1866–1942)
Josias Hoffman, 1st President of the Orange Free State (1807–1879)
Petrus Jacobus Joubert, Boer general and member of the Troika in the South African Republic (1834–1900)
Paul Kruger, member of the Troika, 5th President of South African Republic (1825–1904)
Daniel François Malan, 5th Prime Minister of South Africa and is responsible for laying the groundwork for Apartheid (1874–1959)
Nelson Mandela, 1st democratically elected President of South Africa and joint Nobel Peace Prize winner (1918–2013)
Thabo Mbeki, 2nd post-apartheid President of South Africa (born 1942)
John X. Merriman, last prime minister of the Cape Colony (1841–1926)
Kgalema Motlanthe, 3rd post-apartheid President of South Africa (born 1949)
Tom Naudé, 2nd State President of South Africa (1889–1969)
Marthinus Wessel Pretorius, 3rd President of the Orange Free State, 1st and 3rd President of the ZAR (1819–1901)
Cyril Ramaphosa, 5th post-apartheid President of South Africa (born 1952)
Francis William Reitz, 5th President of the Orange Free State (1844–1934)
Jan Smuts, Boer general, British field marshal, 2nd and 4th Prime Minister of South Africa (1870–1950)
Johannes Strijdom, 6th Prime Minister of South Africa (1893–1958)
Martinus Theunis Steyn, 6th and last President of the Orange Free State (1857–1916)
Charles Robberts Swart, last Governor-General of the Union of South Africa and 1st State President of the RSA (1894–1982)
Hendrik Frensch Verwoerd, 7th Prime Minister of South Africa and primary architect of Apartheid (1901–1966)
Marais Viljoen, 5th and 7th State President of South Africa (1915–2007)
Balthazar Johannes Vorster, 8th Prime Minister and 6th State President of South Africa (1915–1983)
Jacob Zuma, 4th post-apartheid President of South Africa (born 1942)

Provincial Premiers

Nosimo Balindlela, 3rd Premier of the Eastern Cape (born 1949)
Lynne Brown, (interim) 6th Premier of the Western Cape (born 1961)
Ivy Matsepe-Casaburri, 2nd Premier of the Free State (1937–2009)
Grizelda Cjiekella, (acting) Premier of the Northern Cape (1970–2012)
Manne Dipico, 1st Premier of the Northern Cape (born 1959)
Winkie Direko, 3rd Premier of the Free State (1929–2012)
Hazel Jenkins, 3rd Premier of the Northern Cape (born 1960)
Noxolo Kiviet, 5th Premier of the Eastern Cape (born 1963)
Hernus Kriel, 1st Premier of the Western Cape (1941–2015)
Mosiuoa Lekota, 1st Premier of the Free State (born 1948)
Sylvia Lucas, 4th Premier of the Northern Cape (born 1964)
David Mabuza, 4th Premier of Mpumalanga (born 1960)
Ace Magashule, 5th Premier of the Free State (born 1959)
Supra Mahumapelo, 5th Premier of North West (born 1968)
David Makhura, 6th Premier of Gauteng (born 1968)
Thabang Makwetla, 3rd Premier of Mpumalanga (born 1957)
Peter Marais, 3rd Premier of the Western Cape (born 1948)
Beatrice Marshoff, 4th Premier of the Free State (born 1957)
Paul Mashatile, 4th Premier of Gauteng (born 1961)
Stanley Mathabatha, 4th Premier of Limpopo (born 1957)
Cassel Mathale, 3rd Premier of Limpopo (born 1961)
Senzo Mchunu, 6th Premier of KwaZulu-Natal (born 1958)
Willies Mchunu, 7th Premier of KwaZulu-Natal (born 1948)
Frank Mdlalose, 1st Premier of KwaZulu-Natal (1931–2021)
Raymond Mhlaba, 1st Premier of the Eastern Cape (1920–2005)
Zweli Mkhize, 5th Premier of KwaZulu-Natal (born 1956)
Thandi Modise, 4th Premier of North West (born 1959)
Maureen Modiselle, 3rd Premier of North West (born 1941)
Job Mokgoro, 6th Premier of North West (born 1948)
Nomvula Mokonyane, 5th Premier of Gauteng (born 1963)
Popo Molefe, 1st Premier of North West (born 1952)
Edna Molewa, 2nd Premier of North West (1957–2018) 
Sello Moloto, 2nd Premier of Limpopo (born 1964)
Gerald Morkel, 2nd Premier of the Western Cape (1941–2018)
Mathole Motshekga, 2nd Premier of Gauteng (born 1949)
Lionel Mtshali, 3rd Premier of KwaZulu-Natal (1935–2015)
Refilwe Mtsweni-Tsipane, 5th Premier of Mpumalanga (born 1972/73)
S'bu Ndebele, 4th Premier of KwaZulu-Natal (born 1948)
Ben Ngubane, 2nd Premier of KwaZulu-Natal (1941–2021)
Sisi Ntombela, 6th Premier of the Free State (born 1956/1957)
Dipuo Peters, 2nd Premier of the Northern Cape (born 1960)
Mathews Phosa, 1st Premier of Mpumalanga (born 1952)
Ngoako Ramathlodi, 1st Premier of Limpopo (born 1955)
Leonard Ramatlakane, (acting) Premier of the Western Cape (born 1953)
Ebrahim Rasool, 5th Premier of the Western Cape (born 1962)
Zamani Saul, 5th Premier of the Northern Cape (born 1972)
Tokyo Sexwale, 1st Premier of Gauteng (born 1953)
Mbhazima Shilowa, 3rd Premier of Gauteng (born 1958) 
Mbulelo Sogoni, 4th Premier of the Eastern Cape (born 1966)
Makhenkesi Stofile, 2nd Premier of the Eastern Cape (1944–2016)
Marthinus van Schalkwyk, 4th Premier of the Western Cape (born 1959)
Alan Winde, 8th Premier of the Western Cape (born 1965)
Sihle Zikalala, 8th Premier of KwaZulu-Natal (born 1973)
Helen Zille, 7th Premier of the Western Cape (born 1951)

Homelands Leaders

Prince Mangosuthu Buthelezi, Chief Executive Councillor and Chief Minister of KwaZulu (born 1928)
Oupa Gqozo, President of Ciskei (born 1952)
Gen. Bantu Holomisa, Prime Minister of Transkei (born 1955)
Chief Thandathu Jongilizwe Mabandla, chief executive officer; Chief Executive Councillor and Chief Minister of Ciskei (1926–2021)
Dr. Enos John Mabuza, Chief Minister of KaNgwane (1939–1997)
Rocky Malebane-Metsing, President of Bophuthatswana (1949–2016)
Kgosi Lucas Mangope, chief executive officer; Chief Executive Councillor; Chief Minister and President of Bophuthatswana (1923–2018)
Chief George Matanzima, Prime Minister of Transkei (1918–2000)
King Kaiser Matanzima, Chief Minister; Prime Minister and President of Transkei (1915–2003)
Edward Mhinga, acting Chief Minister of Gazankulu (1927–2017)
Job Mokgoro, Administrator (Transitional Executive Council) of Bophuthatswana (born 1948)
Kenneth Mopeli, Chief Executive Councillor and Chief Minister of Qwaqwa (1930–2014)
Chief Patrick Mphephu, chief executive officer; Chief Executive Councillor; Chief Minister and the President of Venda (1924–1988)
King Tutor Vulindlela Ndamase, President of Transkei (1921–1997)
Hudson William Edison Ntsanwisi, Chief of Minister of Gazankulu (1920–1993)
Samuel Dickenson Nxumalo, Chief Minister of Gazankulu (1926–2017)
Dr. Cedric Phatudi, Chief Minister of Lebowa (1912–1987)
Gabriel Ramushwana, Head of State of Venda (1941–2015)
Frank Ravele, Head of State of Venda (1926–1999)
Lt. Gen. Charles Sebe, acting Chief Minister of Ciskei (died c.1991)
Chief Lennox Sebe, Chief Minister and President of Ciskei (1926–1994)
King Botha Sigcau, President of Transkei and father of Stella Sigcau (died c.1978)
Stella Sigcau, Prime of Transkei (1937–2006)
Tjaart van der Walt, Administrator Transitional Executive Council of Bophuthatswana (1934–2019)

Administrators of former provinces

Cornelius Botha, 12th and last Administrator of the Natal Province (1932–2014)
Stoffel Botha, 10th Administrator of the Natal Province (1929–1998)
Radclyffe Cadman, 11th Administrator of the Natal Province (1924–2011)
Dr Willem Adriaan Cruywagen, 10th Administrator of the Transvaal Province (1921–2013)
Nicolaas Frederic de Waal, 1st Administrator of the Cape Province (1853–1932)
Jim Fouché, 8th Administrator of the Orange Free State Province (1898–1980)
Theo Gerdener, 8th Administrator of the Natal Province (1916–2013)
Jan Hendrik Hofmeyr, 3rd Administrator of the Transvaal Province (1894–1948)
Gene Louw, 13th Administrator of the Cape Province (1931–2015)
Nico Malan, 10th Administrator of the Cape Province
William Nico, 7th Administrator of the Transvaal Province (1887–1967)
Frans Hendrik Odendaal, 8th Administrator of the Transvaal Province (1898–1966)
Denis Gem Shepstone, 6th Administrator of the Natal Province (1888–1966)
Alfred Ernest Trollip, 7th Administrator of the Natal Province (1895–1972)
Johannes Van Rensburg, 6th Administrator of the Orange Free State Province (1898–1966)
Gideon Brand van Zyl, 5th Administrator of the Cape Province (1873–1956)
Sir Cornelius Hermanus Wessels, 2nd Administrator of the Orange Free State Province (1851–1924)

Royalty

Kings, queens, princes and princesses

Cetshwayo kaMpande, 4th Zulu king (1826–1884)
Cyprian Bhekuzulu kaSolomon, 7th Zulu king (1924–1945)
Goodwill Zwelethini, 8th king of the Zulu nation (1948–2021)
Mantifombi Dlamini, wife of Goodwill Zweilithini and former Queen of Zulu nation (1956-2021)
Mangosuthu Buthelezi, politician and a Zulu prince (born 1928)
Dingane kaSenzangakhona, 2nd Zulu king and half-brother of Shaka (1795–1840)
Dinuzulu kaCetshwayo, 5th Zulu king, not officially recognized (1868–1913)
Buyelekhaya Dalindyebo, Aa! Zwelibanzi! King of the Thembu (born 1964)
Sabata Dalindyebo, Aa! Jonguhlanga! King of the Thembu (1928–1986)
Faku kaNgqungqushe, King of the Mpondo (1780–1867)
Hintsa ka Khawuta, Aa! Zanzolo! King of Xhosa Nation (1780–1835)
Khawuta kaGcaleka, Aa! Khala! King of the Xhosa Nation (1761–1804)
Langalibalele, Hlubi king (1814–1889)
Ingwenyama Mayitjha II, 7th Ndebele, king of Ndzundza-Mabhoko (1947–2005)
Magogo kaDinuzulu, Zulu princess and mother of Mangosuthu Buthelezi (1900–1984)
Mampuru II, king of the Marota (or Bapedi) (died c.1883)
Lwandile Matanzima, Aa! Zwelenkosi! King of the Western Thembu (1970/71–2010)
Luzuko Matiwane, Aa! Zwelozuko! King of AmaMpondomise (born 1978)
Maselekwane Modjadji, Balobedu's 1st Rain Queen (died 1854)
Masalanabo Modjadji, Balobedu's 2nd Rain Queen (died 1894)
Khetoane Modjadji, Balobedu's 3rd Rain Queen (1869–1959)
Makoma Modjadji, Balobedu's 4th Rain Queen (1905–1980)
Mokope Modjadji, Balobedu's 5th Rain Queen (1936–2001)
Makobo Modjadji, Balobedu's 6th Rain Queen (1978–2005)
Mkabayi kaJama, Zulu princess and sister of Senzangakhona (1750–1843)
Mpande, 3rd Zulu king and half-brother of Shaka (1798–1872)
Mthimkhulu II, King of the AmaHlubi (1778–1818) 
Mzilikazi, king of the Matabele (1790–1868)
Nandi, Mhlongo princess and mother of Shaka (1760–1827)
Tutor Vulindlela Ndamase, Nyangelizwe! King of the Western Pondo  (1921-1997)
Ngqungqushe kaNyawuza, Mpondo King (1715/1760–1810/1815)
Ngubengcuka, Aa! Ndaba! prominent king of the abaThembu  (died 1830)
Emma Sandile, (1842–1892), Aa! Emma! Xhosa Princess and the daughter of King Mgolombane Sandile (1842–1892)
Mgolombane Sandile, Aa! Mgolombane! Xhosa king of the Right Hand House of the Xhosa Nation (1820–1878)
Zanesizwe Sandile, Aa! Zanesizwe! King of the Right Hand House of the Xhosa Nation (1956–2011)
Noloyiso Sandile, Aa! Noloyiso! Zulu Princess and Rharhabe Regent Queen (1963–2020)
Sarili kaHintsa, Aa! Krili! King Of The Xhosa Nation (c. 1810–1892)
Botha Sigcau, Jongilizwe! King of the Eastern Pondo  (died 1978)
Xolilizwe Sigcawu, Aa! Xolilizwe! Xhosa King (1926–2005)
Zwelonke Sigcawu, Aa! Zwelonke! Xhosa king (1968–2019)
Sekhukhune, king of the Marota (or Bapedi) (1814–1882)
Senzangakhona kaJama, Zulu king and father of Shaka  (1762–1816)
Shaka, founder of the Zulu nation (1787–1828)
Solomon kaDinuzulu, 6th Zulu king, not officially recognized (1891–1933)
Victor Thulare III, king of the Pedi (1980–2021)
uZibhebhu kaMaphitha, Zulu prince and chief (1841–1904)

Tribal leaders and prophets
See also: Gcaleka rulers, Rharhabe rulersNdwandwe people, Xhosa Chiefs, Zulus

Bambatha kaMancinza, Zulu chief of the amaZondi clan and Bambatha Rebellion (1865–1906)
Chief Albert Luthuli, Zulu chief and political activist (1898–1967)
Adam Kok, Griqua leader (1811–1875)
David Stuurman, Khoi chief and political activist (1773–1830)
Thandatha Jongilizwe Mabandla, Aa! Jongilizwe! amaBhele chief, Tyume Valley, Alice, Ciskei (1926–2021)
Makhanda, amaXhosa prophet (died 1819)
Maqoma, Aa! Jongumsobomvu! amaRharhabe chief (1798–1873)
Chief Mqalo, Amakhuze chief, Ciskei region (1916–2008)
Moshoeshoe I, Basotho chief (c. 1786–1870)
Nongqawuse, millennialist amaXhosa prophetess (c. 1840–1898)
Ntsikana, amaXhosa prophet (1780–1821)
Lennox Sebe, Chief of AmaNtinde (1926–1994)  
Nkosi Ntsikayezwe Sigcau, traditional leader of Lwandlolubomvu Traditional Council (1947–1996) 
Sigananda kaSokufa, Zulu aristocrat (c. 1815–1906)
Hendrik Spoorbek, prophet and magician (died 1845)
Mbongeleni Zondi, Zulu chief and great-grandson of Inkosi Bambatha kaMancinza (1969–2009)

Atheists

Zackie Achmat, AIDS activist, (born 1962)
David Benatar, professor of philosophy (born 1966)
Barry Duke, activist, journalist, editor of The Freethinker (born 1947)
Nadine Gordimer, activist, writer, Nobel laureate (1923–2014)
Ronnie Kasrils, politician (born 1938)
Jacques Rousseau, secular activist, social commentator (born 1971)
Harold Rubin, visual artist, musician (1932–2020)
Joe Slovo, politician (1926–1995)
Lewis Wolpert, author, biologist, broadcaster (1929–2021)

Prelates, clerics and evangelists

William Anderson, missionary (1769–1852)
Nicholas Bhengu, evangelist and founder of Assemblies of God (1909–1986)
Allan Boesak, cleric and anti-apartheid activist (born 1945)
David Jacobus Bosch, missiologist and theologian (1929–1992)
Angus Buchan, evangelist (born 1947)
Frank Chikane, cleric and anti-apartheid activist (born 1951)
John William Colenso, Anglican bishop of Natal (1814–1883)
Ahmed Deedat (1918–2005)
S.J. du Toit, cleric, Afrikaans language pioneer and founder member of the Genootskap vir Regte Afrikaners (1847–1911)
Allan Hendrickse, cleric and MP (1927–2005)
Denis Hurley, Roman Catholic Archbishop of Durban (1915–2004)
Edward Lekganyane, the Zion Christian Church (ZCC) leader (1922–1967)
Engenas Lekganyane, the Zion Christian Church (ZCC) founder (1885–1948)
Albert Luthuli, cleric, politician and 1960 Nobel Peace Prize winner (c. 1898–1967)
Thabo Makgoba, current Archbishop of Cape Town and Primate of the Anglican Church of Southern Africa (born 1960)
Charlotte Maxeke, religious leader and political activist (1874–1939)
Ray McCauley, head of Rhema church (born 1949)
Robert Moffat, missionary, Bible translator and founder of Kuruman (1795–1883)
Smangaliso Mkhatshwa, Catholic priest (born 1939)
Frederick Samuel Modise, founder of the International Pentecostal Holiness Church (1914–1998)
Glayton Modise, the International Pentecostal Holiness Church leader (1940–2016)
Andrew Murray (1828–1917)
Zithulele Patrick Mvemve, South African Roman Catholic bishop (1941–2020)
Selby Mvusi, theologian and artist (1929–1967)
Wilfrid Napier, cardinal of the Catholic Church (born 1941)
Beyers Naudé, cleric and anti-apartheid activist (1915–2004)
Jozua Naudé, pastor, school founder and co-founder of the Afrikaner Broederbond (1873–1948)
Carl Niehaus, theologian and former spokesman of South African president Nelson Mandela (born 1959)
Albert Nolan, Catholic priest (born 1934)
John Philip, missionary (1775–1851)
Barney Pityana, human rights lawyer and theologian (born 1945)
Ambrose Reeves, Anglican bishop and opponent of Apartheid (1899–1980)
David Russell, South African Anglican bishop (1938–2014)
 Isaiah Shembe, the Church of Nazareth founder (1865–1935)
Desmond Tutu, cleric and Nobel Peace Prize winner (1931–2021)
William Cullen Wilcox, missionary (1850–1928)

Sport

Conservationists
Ian Player (1927–2014)
James Stevenson-Hamilton (1867–1957)
John Varty (born 1950)

Food
 Bertus Basson (born 1979)
 Karen Dudley (born 1968)
 Prue Leith (born 1940)
 Abigail Mbalo-Mokoena
 Jenny Morris
 Nompumelelo Mqwebu (born 1977)
 Siba Mtongana (born 1984)
 Kamini Pather (born 1983)
 Reuben Riffel (born 1974)
 Lesego Semenya (1982–2021)
 Faldela Williams (1952–2014)

Travelers, adventurers and pioneers

Alexander Biggar, colonial pioneer (1781–1838)
Jeanne M. Borle, missionary and naturalist (1880 – ca. 1979)
William John Burchell, naturalist traveler (1781–1863)
Francisco de Almeida, adventurer buried in Cape Town (c. 1450–1510)
Bartolomeu Dias, explorer who reached eastern Cape (c. 1450–1500)
John Dunn, colonial pioneer (1833–1895)
Robert Jacob Gordon, explorer, soldier, naturalist (1743–1795)
Emil Holub, explorer (1847–1902)
Nathaniel Isaacs, Natal traveler (1808–1872)
Dick King, colonial pioneer (1813–1871)
François Levaillant, Cape naturalist traveler (1753–1824)
Karl Mauch, traveling geologist (1873–1875)
Harriet A. Roche, Transvaal traveler (1835–1921)
Carl Peter Thunberg, Cape naturalist traveler (1743–1828)
Sibusiso Vilane, first black African to summit Mount Everest (born 1970)
Kingsley Holgate, traveler and pioneer (born 1946)
Mike Horn, explorer, traveler, environmentalist, adventurer (born 1966)
James Alexander, explorer of the west coast and Namibia (1803–1885)
Saray Khumalo, explorer and mountaineer (born 1972)

Criminals
Daisy de Melker, murderer (1886–1932)
William Foster, leader of the Foster Gang
Allan Heyl, Stander Gang member and bank robber (died 2020)
Cedric Maake, serial killer (born 1965)
Bulelani Mabhayi, serial killer (born 1974)
Simon Majola, robber and serial killer who, with (born 1968)
Fanuel Makamu, robber, rapist and serial killer (born 1977)
Andries Makgae, serial killer and rapist (born 1962)
Lee McCall, Stander Gang member and bank robber (1950–1984)
Nicholas Lungisa Ncama, a rapist and serial killer
Velaphi Ndlangamandla, robber and serial killer (born 1966)
Solomon Ngobeni, the last person to be executed by the government of South Africa (died 1989)
Butana Almond Nofomela, murder (born 1957)
Gert van Rooyen, paedophile (1938–1990)
Khangayi Sedumedi, Killer South African serial killer and rapist (born 1977)
Schabir Shaik, convicted fraudster
Norman Afzal Simons, rapist and serial killer (born 1967)
Moses Sithole, convicted serial rapist and murderer (born 1964)
Rashied Staggie, crime boss (1961–2019)
Andre Stander, gang member (1946–1984)
Thozamile Taki, serial killer (born 1971)
Sipho Thwala, rapist and serial killer  (born 1968) 
Dorethea van der Merwe, first woman to be hanged for murder under the Union of South Africa
Bulelani Vukwana, spree killer (c. 1973–2002)
Elias Xitavhudzi, serial killer
Christopher Mhlengwa Zikode, rapist and serial killer (born 1975)

Other

Sir Herbert Baker, influential in South African architecture (1862–1946)
Nozipho Bhengu, woman whose death was from an AIDS-related illness (1974–2006)
Fredie Blom, South African supercentenarian Fredie Blom (1904–2020)
Denise Darvall, considered to be donor for the first human heart transplant (1943–1967)
Ncoza Dlova, heralded as first black female head of University of KwaZulu-Natal's School of Clinical Medicine
Napoléon Eugène, last of Napoleons who died in Zulu war (1856–1879)
Emily Hobhouse, African British welfare campaigner for South Africans (1860–1926)
John Hutchinson, thorough contributor to South African botany (1884–1972)
Nkosi Johnson, child who died of AIDS (1989–2001)
Isabel Jean Jones, early consumer advocate journalist (died 2008)
Masego Kgomo, South African girl murdered (1999–2009)
Sandra Laing, racial classification victim (born 1955)
Paul Lloyd Jr, first South African wrestler to wrestle in WWE, son of successful SA wrestling promoter Paul Lloyd (born 1981)
Asnath Mahapa, first female South African pilot (born 1979)
Joe Mamasela, former Apartheid government spy (born 1953)
Nomkhitha Virginia Mashinini, South African apartheid detainee, the mother of political figure Tsietsi Mashinini, and a community worker (1935–2008)
Leigh Matthews, South African university student, kidnapped and murdered (1983–2004)
Breaker Morant, Australian Boer War soldier executed by the British Army (1864–1902)
Uyinene Mrwetyana, South African student, raped and murdered (2000–2019)
Hastings Ndlovu, poster victim of the Soweto riots (1961–1976)
Hector Pieterson, poster victim of the Soweto riots (1964–1976)
Mrs. Ples, hominid fossil (born c. 2.6 to 2.8 million years ago)
Raymond Rahme, first African to reach a final table at a World Series of Poker Main Event, finishing third (born 1945)
Willem Ratte, soldier and criminal (born 1948)
Rosenkowitz sextuplets, first known set of sextuplets to survive their infancy (born 1974)
Maki Skosana, necklaced due to be suspected as a police informer (1961–1985)
Reeva Steenkamp, South African model and paralegal (1983–2013)
Adam Tas, colonial activist (1668–1722)
Andries Tatane, Ficksburg activist killed by police (1978–2011)
Taung Child, hominid fossil (born c. 2.5 million years ago)
Louis Washkansky, recipient of first human heart transplant (1913–1967)
Wolraad Woltemade, colonial hero figure (c. 1708–1773)

See also
Great South Africans, television program listing the 100 greatest South Africans as voted for by viewers
List of South African office-holders
List of Southern Ndebele people
List of State leaders in the 20th century (1951–2000)
List of white Africans of European ancestry
List of Xhosa people
List of Zulu people
Lists of people by nationality
They Shaped Our Century, survey by Media24 in 1999 about 100 most influential South Africans (and people associated with South Africa) of the twentieth century

References